XOXO is an American contemporary clothing brand, owned by Kellwood Company. XOXO is targeted towards the teenage and young adult females demographic.

History 
It was started by Gregg and Lynne Fiene in 1991 along with their partners, Marc and Michelle Bohbot. The  brand includes apparel and accessories, including handbags, sunglasses, belts, and jewelry. The partners sold the company to Aris Industries in 1999, who sold it to Global Brand Holdings in 2003. Rights to the brand were later licensed to Kellwood.

References

External links

Bags (fashion)
Clothing brands of the United States
American companies established in 1991
Eyewear brands of the United States
1990s fashion
2000s fashion
2010s fashion